"Fires" is the lead single released from Irish singer/songwriter Ronan Keating's ninth solo album with the same name. The song was premiered on 21 July 2012 on BBC Radio 2. The single as released as a digital download on 2 September 2012. The song was only available as a digital download and sold 10,000 copies.

Music video
The music video for the song premiered on 1 August 2012, via YouTube. It shows two versions of the singer running and driving to the same location.

Track listing

Chart performance

References

2012 songs
2012 singles
Ronan Keating songs
Songs written by Shelly Poole
Polydor Records singles
Songs written by Henrik Barman Michelsen
Songs written by Edvard Forre Erfjord